Gerolamo Acciabianca (died 1537) was a Roman Catholic prelate who served as Bishop of Nusco (1523–1537).

Biography
On 17 Jun 1523, Gerolamo Acciabianca was appointed by Pope Adrian VI as Bishop of Nusco.
He served as Bishop of Nusco until his death in 1537.

See also 
Catholic Church in Italy

References

External links and additional sources
 (for Chronology of Bishops) 
 (for Chronology of Bishops) 

16th-century Italian Roman Catholic bishops
1537 deaths
Bishops appointed by Pope Adrian VI